The Ironmaster may refer to"
 The Ironmaster (novel): A novel by Georges Ohnet.
 The Ironmaster (1933 film). 
 The Ironmaster (1948 film).